Robert Duff is the name of:

Robert Duff (Royal Navy officer) (died 1787), Admiral and governor for Newfoundland in 1775
Robert Duff (Newfoundland politician) (1868–19??), Newfoundland businessman and politician
Sir Robert Duff (politician, born 1835) (1835–1895), Scottish Liberal politician, governor for New South Wales between 1893 and 1895

See also
Duff (surname)